Sofiane Diop (born 9 June 2000) is a French professional footballer who plays as a midfielder for Ligue 1 club Nice.

Club career
On 5 July 2018, Diop signed his first professional contract with Monaco after his debut season with the reserve side of Rennes. He made his professional debut in a 4–0 loss to Paris Saint-Germain on 4 August 2018 in the Trophée des Champions.

On 29 August 2022, fellow Ligue 1 club Nice announced the signing of Diop from Monaco.

International career
Diop was born in France to a Senegalese father and Moroccan mother. He is a youth international for the France U18s.

Personal life
Sofiane's younger brother Edan Diop is also a professional footballer.

Career statistics

Honours 
Monaco

 Coupe de France runner-up: 2020–21

References

External links
 AS Monaco Profile
 
 

2000 births
Living people
Sportspeople from Tours, France
French footballers
France youth international footballers
Association football midfielders
Tours FC players
Stade Rennais F.C. players
AS Monaco FC players
FC Sochaux-Montbéliard players
OGC Nice players
Ligue 1 players
Ligue 2 players
Championnat National 2 players
Championnat National 3 players
French sportspeople of Moroccan descent
French sportspeople of Senegalese descent
Footballers from Centre-Val de Loire